Parco Adriano is a park in Rome, Italy on the northern bank of the Tiber, just to the east of the Vatican.  It contains the Castel Sant'Angelo.

References

Parks in Rome
Rome R. XIV Borgo